Mount Himekami (Himekami-san) is a mountain in Morioka, Iwate Prefecture, Japan. It lends its name to the band Himekami.
A relatively easy hike to its summit is practicable from April to November.

References 

Himekami